The American Glaucoma Society (AGS) is a subspecialty society in ophthalmology that promotes education and research about glaucoma among physicians and scientists.  Founded in 1985 by thirteen original members, it now has more than 400 members. The society holds workshops annual meetings.

See also
 Charles D. Phelps

References

External links
American Glaucoma Society site

Medical associations based in the United States
Organizations established in 1985
Glaucoma
Eye care in the United States
Medical and health organizations based in California
1985 establishments in the United States